Robert Schieler (born 1950 in Philadelphia) is a member of the Brothers of the Christian Schools, founded by St. John Baptist de La Salle. He was elected Superior General of his religious community in Rome on May 20, 2014.

Background
After completing his studies in Modern European History and a PhD in educational administration, worked as a teacher in the U.S. and, after making his final profession in 1979, he worked as a missionary 11 years in the Philippines.

In his congregation Schieler made several managerial tasks: Auxiliary Visitor of the  District of Baltimore from 1991 to 1998, Director of Education for the USA- Toronto Region from 1998 to 2001 and Visitor of his district since 2001 to 2007. Since 2007 and until his election as Superior General, he was the General Counsel for the United States and Canada.  Since 2011, he has served on the Board of Trustees of Saint Mary's University of Minnesota. In 2022 he has resigned  as Superior General of the De la Salle Brothers and was replaced by Br. Armin Luistro .

References 

 

 
 
 
 

1950 births
Living people
Educators from Philadelphia
De La Salle Brothers
De La Salle Brothers Superiors General